Armenian literature begins around AD 400 with the invention of the Armenian alphabet by Mesrop Mashtots.

History

Early literature

Only a handful of fragments have survived from the most ancient Armenian literary tradition preceding the Christianization of Armenia in the early 4th century, largely preserved by Movses Khorenatsi. The start of Christian Armenian literature dates to around the year 406 with the invention of the Armenian alphabet by Mesrop for the purpose of translating Biblical books into Armenian.

Isaac, the Catholicos of Armenia, formed a school of translators who were sent to Edessa, Athens, Constantinople, Alexandria, Antioch, Caesarea in Cappadocia, and elsewhere, to procure codices both in Syriac and Greek and translate them. From Syriac were made the first version of the New Testament, the version of Eusebius' History and his Life of Constantine (unless this be from the original Greek), the homilies of Aphraates, the Acts of Gurias and Samuna, the works of Ephrem Syrus (partly published in four volumes by the Mechitharists of Venice). In these first years of the 5th century were composed some of the apocryphal works which, like the Discourses attributed to St. Gregory and the History of Armenia said to have come from Agathangelus, are asserted to be the works of these and other well-known men. This early period of Armenian literature also produced many original compositions, including Eznik of Kolb's "Refutation of the Sects", Koryun's "Life of Mashtots", P'avstos Buzand's History of the Armenians and Ghazar Parpetsi's History of the Armenians. Eznik and Koryun were disciples of Mashtots.

The Golden Age also includes the Histories of Yeghishe and Movses Khorenatsi, although it has been suggested that the works of these authors may have been composed at a later date.

Medieval era
Armenia is known to have been a nation often occupied by nearby powers, such as the Sassanid Empire. The beginning of the Medieval era was marked by the Arab conquest of Armenia. The people then started to talk of a great hero who would be able to liberate them and reestablish Armenian sovereignty. David of Sasun, known as Sasuntsi Davit', is the medieval Armenian equivalent of Hercules. For over a thousand years the Daredevils of Sassoun was passed from grandfathers to their grandsons thanks to the Armenian oral tradition, and it is difficult to classify his stories as ancient or medieval. In 1873, the story was first written down by Archbishop Garegin Srvandztiants, who copied word for word the tale as told by a peasant storyteller from Moush named Grbo. Other versions of the tale from various regions of Armenia were copied down in the ensuing years, and during the early Soviet Armenia, the stories were collated into a "unified version"; a narrative which connected dozens of isolated episodes, fragments, and near-complete though differing versions of the legend. One of the most famous treatments of the story was the verse rendition made by Hovhannes Toumanian in 1902. His poem only covers the story of David, which is actually only one of 4 parts of the story, although the central portion.

The four portions of the story are named after their heroes: Sanasar & Balthazar (Sanasar yev Baghdasar), Lion-Mher (Aryudz Mher), David of Sassoun (Sassountsi Tavit), and Mher the Younger (Pokr Mher). Sanasar is the father of Lion-Mher, who is the father of David, who is the father of Mher the Younger. Mher the younger is cursed to never bear progeny and his superhuman powers are too much for the world to handle, so he is enclosed in a mountain cave where he waits until the end of the world to come out and restore order. (similar to the western legends of King Arthur or Barbarossa.)

Despite being Christian poetry, numerous fantastic creatures, good and evil, influence the action.

One of the ancestors of the legendary David is the Lady Dzovinar, who agrees to marry the 90-year-old Caliph of Baghdad in order to save her people. Sanasar and Balthasar were their two sons. Sanasar moves to Sassoun, the fortress-town of Armenia, now located in Turkey. He has three children, the eldest of them being the Great Mher of Sassoun, with superhuman powers. Mher's veritable son is David of Sassoun. However, he also gets another son from the Arabic queen of Egypt. He is known as Misra Melik, which literally means "The sovereign of Egypt". He is probably the figure of all of what the Armenians resented; traitors, and foreign oppressors.

Throughout the years the half-brothers fought, and eventually David chops his nemesis in half.

Religious literature

The medieval period opens with comparative sterility. It was mostly important in the 8th century, that of John Otznetzi, surnamed the "Philosopher". A "Discourse against the Paulicians", a "Synodal Discourse", and a collection of the canons of the councils and the Fathers anterior to his day, are the principal works of his now extant. About the same time appeared the translations of the works of several of the Fathers, particularly of St. Gregory of Nyssa and Cyril of Alexandria, from the pen of Stephen, Bishop of Syunik. It was two centuries later that the celebrated "History of Armenia" by the Catholicos John V the Historian came forth, covering the period from the origin of the nation to the year A.D. 925. A contemporary of his, Annine of Mok, an abbot and the most celebrated theologian of the time, composed a treatise against the Tondrakians, a sect imbued with Manicheism. The name of Chosrov, Bishop of Andzevatsentz, is honoured because of his interesting commentaries on the Breviary and Mass-Prayers. Gregory of Narek, his son, is the Armenian Pindar from whose pen came elegies, odes, panegyrics, and homilies. Stephen Asoghtk, whose "Universal History" reaches down to A.D. 1004, and Gregory Magistros, whose long poem on the Old and New Testaments displays much application, are the last writers worthy of mention in this period.

Cilician renaissance
The modern period of Armenian literature can well be dated from the renaissance of letters among the Armenians in the 12th century. The Catholicos Nerses surnamed the Gracious, is the most brilliant author in the beginning of this period. Besides his poetic works, such as the "Elegy on the Taking of Edessa", there are prose works including a "Pastoral Letter", a "Synodal Discourse", and his "Letters". This age gave us also a commentary on St. Luke and one on the Catholic Epistles. Of note, too, is the Synodal Discourse of Nerses of Lambron, Archbishop of Tarsus, delivered at the Council of Hromcla in 1179, which is anti-Monophysite in tone. The 13th century gave birth to Vartan the Great, whose talents were those of a poet, an exegete, and a theologian, and whose "Universal History" is extensive in the field it covers. Gregory of Datev (also transliterated as Tatev) in the next century composed his "Question Book", which is a fiery polemic against the Catholics. A major religious and lyric poet of the late Middle Ages was Yovhannēs T‘lkuranc‘i (c. 1450-1535).

Foreign rule
The 16th century saw Armenia in the hands of Persia, and a check was for the time put on literature. However, in scattering the Armenians to all parts of Europe, the Persian invasion had its good effects. Armenian printing shops were established in Venice and Rome, and in the following century (the seventeenth) in Lemberg, Milan, Paris, and elsewhere. Old works were republished and new ones given forth. The Mechitarists of Venice have been the leaders in this movement; but their publications, although numerous, have been often uncritical. Their brothers, the Mechitarists of Vienna, have been likewise active in this work and it is to their society that Balgy and Catergian belong, two well-known writers on Armenian topics. Russia, Constantinople and Etchmiadzin are the other centres of Armenian literary efforts and the last-named place is especially worthy of note, imbued as it is today with German scientific methods and taste. Looking back over the field of Armenian literature, we note a trait the national character displayed in the bent Armenians have had for singing the glories of their land in history and chronicles.

Armenian troubadours
Divided between the Ottoman Empire and the Safavid Empire, the Armenians developed a troubadour tradition. A troubadour, called աշուղ in Armenian, would go from village to village, and town to town, and would recite his literature to the people. More successful ones, such as Sayat-Nova, would participate in competitions in the courts of Georgian Kings, Muslim Khans, or Armenian Meliks. They would often talk about their feelings for their women by using the popular language that was riddled with foreign influences, instead of Classical Armenian, which was obsolete outside churches and schools.

19th century and early 20th century
Notable writers from this period include Siamanto, Hagop Baronian, Vahan Tekeyan, Hovhannes Hovhannisyan, Levon Shant, Krikor Zohrab, Rupen Zartarian, Avetis Aharonyan, Garegin Nzhdeh, Atrpet, Gostan Zarian, Hrand Nazariantz and Nigol Aghpalian.

The Revivalists: Armenian Romanticists
The 19th century beheld a great literary movement that was to give rise to modern Armenian literature. This period of time during which Armenian culture flourished is known as the Revival period (Zartonk). The Revivalist authors of Constantinople and Tiflis, almost identical to the Romanticists of Europe, were interested in encouraging Armenian nationalism. Most of them adopted the newly created Eastern or Western variants of the Armenian language depending on the targeted audience, and preferred them over classical Armenian (grabar).

The veritable creator of modern Armenian literature was Khachatur Abovian (1804–1848). Abovian was the first author to abandon the classical Armenian and adopt the modern for his works, thus ensuring their diffusion. Abovian's most famed work, Wounds of Armenia, returns to the theme of the Armenian people's suffering under foreign domination. Abovian dedicated his life to writing and educating others on the subject of Armenia and her people. 
Mikael Nalbandian's poem "Song of the Italian Girl" may have been the inspiration for the Armenian national anthem, Mer Hayrenik.
Raffi (Hakob Melik-Hakobian) was the grand romanticist of Armenian literature. In his works, Raffi revived the grandeur of Armenia's historic past. In the novel Sparks, the heroes fight for the liberation of their people. This theme of oppression under foreign rule is also evident in his novels Jalaleddin and The Fool.

The Revivalist period ended in 1885–1890, when the Armenian people went through tumultuous times. Notable events were the Berlin Treaty of 1878, the independence of Balkan nations such as Bulgaria, and of course, the Hamidian massacres of 1895–1896.

Armenian Realists
Newspapers

Some specialists claim that the Armenian Realist authors appeared when the Arevelk (Orient) newspaper was founded (1884). Writers such as Arpiar Arpiarian, Levon Pashalian, Krikor Zohrab, Melkon Gurjian, Dikran Gamsarian and others revolved around the said newspaper. The other important newspaper at that time was the Hayrenik (Fatherland) newspaper, which became very populist, encouraged criticism, etc.

Despite these facts, Armenians weren't allowed to use words like Armenia, nation, fatherland, liberty, and progress in their newspapers and other written productions.

After 1885, Armenian authors were interested in depicting a realistic representation of life, along with its less attractive aspects. However, some authors retained romantic influences.

Soviet Armenia
The literary tradition of Khachatur Abovian, Mikael Nalbandian and Raffi was continued. This revival of tradition was carried out by such writers and poets as Hovhannes Tumanyan, Yeghishe Charents and the like. This revival took place under the Communist system, much restricting the freedom of expression of the writers.

In the late 1960s, under Leonid Brezhnev, a new generation of Armenian writers emerged. As Armenian history of the 1920s and of the Genocide came to be more openly discussed, writers like Paruyr Sevak, Gevork Emin, Silva Kaputikyan and Hovhannes Shiraz began a new era of literature. With the decline in Soviet censorship, Modernist and Avantgarde artists emerged, and poets, like Henrik Edoyan and Artem Harutyunyan were producing poetry that neither was rhymed nor fitted Socialist Realism.

Independent Armenia
A new generation of writers is currently burgeoning in independent Armenia. The lack of independent, objective literary criticism makes it difficult to cover this most modern era of Armenian literature. Extant tensions between the Soviet era "Writers' Union of Armenia" and independent literary groups have resulted in mutual calumnies even on issues of classification as to who Armenia's writers are.

Among the more popular of present era writers addressing issues of social dystopia and political corruption are Vahram Sahakyan and Vahe Avetian. The latter has been living in Sweden since late nineties as a result of persecution by Armenian authorities.

Another writer whose literature is difficult to classify is the American writer Armen Melikian who briefly repatriated to Armenia in 2002 and started writing in Armenian, the official language of Armenia. Melikian has disavowed allegiance to Armenian culture or literature following his exile and ostracism, yet his most recent work "Journey to Virginland" published in the United States in 2010 garnering eleven literary awards deals with some of the most fundamental issues plaguing Armenian society, such as gender relations, religious orientation, and political corruption.

See also

 List of Armenian writers
 Matenadaran
 National Library of Armenia

Notes

References 

Text translated from the Armenian: Multiple authors, Arti Hye Kraganoutioun, B. Hador [Modern Armenian Literature, volume II], Montreal, Canada, 2004 pg.9-19

Bibliography 
 Agop Jack Hacikyan, Gabriel Basmajian, Edward S. Franchuk, Nourhan Ouzounian, The Heritage of Armenian Literature: From the oral tradition to the Golden Age, Detroit, Wayne State University Press, 2000.
 Agop Jack Hacikyan, Gabriel Basmajian, Edward S. Franchuk, Nourhan Ouzounian, The Heritage of Armenian Literature: From the sixth to the eighteenth century, Detroit, Wayne State University Press, 2002.
 Agop Jack Hacikyan, Gabriel Basmajian, Edward S. Franchuk, Nourhan Ouzounian, The Heritage of Armenian Literature: From the eighteenth century to modern times, Detroit, Wayne State University Press, 2005.
 Srbouhi Hairapetian, A History of Armenian Literature: From Ancient Times to the Nineteenth Century, Delmar, N.Y., Caravan Books, 1995.
 Robert William Thomson, A Bibliography of Classical Armenian Literature to 1500 AD, Turnhout, Brepols, 1995.
 Robert William Thomson, Supplement to A Bibliography of Classical Armenian Literature to 1500 AD, in: Le Muséon, 120, 2007, pp. 163–223.

External links
 Online collection of Armenian texts
 Online collection of Armenian literature
 Ter-Gabrielyan, Gevorg: "The Archeology of Future Literature: Digging out Prose from Independent Armenia’s History" in the Caucasus Analytical Digest No. 14
 David of Sassoun